Bibasis gomata, commonly known as the pale green awlet, is a butterfly belonging to the family Hesperiidae. It is found in Northeast India, the Western Ghats and parts of Southeast Asia. The butterfly was reassigned to genus Burara by Vane-Wright and de Jong (2003) and is considered by them to be Burara gomata.

Range
The pale green awlet ranges from India, Myanmar, the Malay Peninsula, the Philippines, and the Indonesian archipelago. In India, the butterfly is found in South India up to North Kanara, and along the Himalayas from Sikkim to Assam and eastwards to Myanmar.

The type locality is Darjeeling in the north of West Bengal.

Status
This species is rare in South India but not rare in the Himalayas.

Description

The butterfly has a wingspan of 50 to 55 mm.

Edward Yerbury Watson (1891) gives a detailed description:

Habits
This butterfly is crepuscular.

Host plants
The larva has been recorded on Schefflera venulosa, Schefflera wallichiana, Ribesiodes garciniaefolium, Schefflera lucidum, Schefflera lurida, Schefflera octophylla, Trevesia sundaica, Embelia garciniaefolia and Horsfieldia species.

Cited references

References

Print

Watson, E. Y. (1891) Hesperiidae indicae. Vest and Co. Madras.

Online

Brower, Andrew V. Z. and Warren, Andrew, (2007). Coeliadinae Evans 1937. Version 21 February 2007 (temporary). http://tolweb.org/Coeliadinae/12150/2007.02.21 in The Tree of Life Web Project, http://tolweb.org/

Bibasis
Butterflies of Asia
Butterflies described in 1865
Butterflies of Africa
Taxa named by Frederic Moore